A claims adjuster, desk adjuster, field adjuster, or general adjuster (claim adjuster, claims handler, claim handler or loss adjuster in the United Kingdom, Ireland, Australia, South Africa, the Caribbean and New Zealand) investigates insurance claims by interviewing the claimant and witnesses, consulting police and hospital records, and inspecting property damage to determine the extent of the insurance company's liability. Other claims adjusters who represent policyholders may aid in the preparation of an insurance claim.

Duties

In the United States, claims adjusters typically:
 Verify an insurance policy exists for the insured person and/or property. In general, these are written by the policy-holding insurance company.
 Review the insurance policy to determine if coverage exists for the loss(es).
 Assess risk(s) of loss(es), or damages to property, culminating in the loss of property and or bodily injury.
 After completing the above investigations, evaluate the covered injuries and/or damages.
 Negotiate a settlement according to the applicable law(s), and identify coverages for which the insured is covered, following best insurance practices.

In casualty insurance, the main types of coverage include, but may not be limited to, the following:

 First-party auto and other than auto coverages (sometimes referred to collision and comprehensive coverages). There are numerous types of first-party insurance coverages for any kind of risk of loss or damages.
 Third-party liability for property damage of others' property and bodily injury

Classes

Claim service representatives (employed by the insurance company, or an independent adjusting company). Adjusters may handle "property claims" involving damage to buildings and structures, or "liability claims" involving personal injuries or third-person property damage from liability situations, such as motor vehicle accidents, slip and falls, dog bites, or alleged negligent behavior. Some adjusters handle both types of claims and are known as "multi-line" adjusters. Also "all lines adjusters" may handle any type of claim already identified and also include professional liability, hospital professional liability, excess liability, physicians and surgeons liability, aircraft liability/hull, inland marine, ocean marine, boiler, and machinery, as well as various types of bond losses.

Public adjusters are licensed insurance professionals who work exclusively for the policyholder and charge a fee for this service based on a small percentage of the claim. This means there should be no inherent conflict of interest when it comes to advocating on the policyholder's behalf to the insurance company.

An independent adjuster could be working for multiple insurance companies or self-insured entities.

An adjuster will frequently verify that coverage applies through an insurance policy, investigate liability for the damages caused, and make compensation to the injured person based on their emotional or physical property damages.

Specific duties include:
Notifying the insurer of a covered loss as defined under the policy of insurance
Responding to claims in a timely manner
Filing paperwork
Communicating with policyholders
Investigating liability
Assessing damages
Researching, detailing, and substantiating each aspect of the claim, including building damage, contents, and extra living expense claims
Preparing a detailed damages report based on monthly updated insurance cost software for the purpose of making an offer of settlement to the insured
If needed for specialty cost coding, negotiating with product/service providers on time and cost of repairs for the purpose of making an offer of settlement to the insured
Ensuring accurate procedures
Protecting the interest of the insurance company the adjuster represents when dealing with claimants
Maintaining computer skills with a high degree of proficiency

Some states now require adjusters to disclose to claimants whose interest specifically independent, staff, and public adjuster represent before they proceed with the policyholder.

Local chapters of licensed public insurance adjusters or state agencies maintain records of adjusters, which can be checked to ensure that an adjuster is properly licensed and in good standing. National chapters include the American Association of Public Insurance Adjusters and the National Association of Public Insurance Adjusters. Some states also have state-level chapters, including the Florida Association of Public Insurance Adjusters.

Some states accept the Associate of Claims designation and will waive the licensing examination and grant a license by the state insurance commission. Some insurance carriers and independent adjusting companies provide in-house training certified by the state insurance commission. They must be pre-approved by the licensing division. An adjuster license is issued to those who meet the requirements.

Working conditions
Claims adjusters work long hours including nights and weekends. Their work is appointment based and must revolve around the needs of clients.

Staff adjusters are those who work for a specific insurance company and may have a team that works and travels together to different parts of the country. Adjusters should become familiar with the reimbursement rules for each company with whom they work and track all expenses used in the line of work.

Computer skills are essential, including keyboard skills, as most insurance companies produce and store estimates and other documents digitally, using laptop computers, mobile phones, and digital cameras. Claims adjusting also requires a level of physical strength and stamina. Property adjusters, for example, are often required to operate a 50-pound ladder and must stand, walk, kneel, crawl, and perform other physical demands as they investigate damaged property.

References

Financial services occupations
Insurance industry
Legal professions